Kong: The Animated Series is an animated television series that follows King Kong, the title character based on the 1933 film of the same name. The series was a co-production between BKN International, Ellipse Animation and M6, and premiered in France on the latter network on May 2, 2001.

Kong was created to compete with Godzilla: The Series, and was the first show produced by BKN not to air in syndication.

Plot
When King Kong fell to his death from the Empire State Building upon being shot down by biplanes in 1933, a scientist named Dr. Lorna Jenkins took DNA samples from him which she used to recreate a clone counterpart of the original Kong with the help of the DNA of her grandson, Jason. Many years later, Dr. Lorna Jenkins sends an e-mail to her grandson where he and his friend, Eric "Tan" Tannenbaum IV are invited to Kong's home on Kong Island. What they didn't know is that their university professor Ramone De La Porta had tampered with the e-mail so that he got invited as well. Upon meeting the native girl Lua, the group is taken to Dr. Lorna Jenkin's lab where Ramone's true colors are shown. Upon getting access to the Cyber-Link technology, Ramone uses it to steal some of the Primal Stones in a plot to take over the world. The Primal Stones were used to keep the fire demon named Chiros in his prison. With the help of his Cyber-Link that can merge him with Kong, Jason and his friends must work to reclaim the Primal Stones from De La Porta and his followers while fighting off the forces of Chiros.

Characters

Main characters
 Kong (vocal effects provided by Scott McNeil) - One of the main protagonists of the series. He is a genetically engineered clone of the original King Kong created by Lorna Jenkins by using the DNA of the deceased original Kong and from her grandson's DNA. Because of that, he has a younger brother relationship with Jason, signified by Jason calling Kong "Bro". He is known as The Protector, using his strength and the Primal Stones to protect the world from the demon Chiros. Through the use of the Cyber-Link, Jason can fuse with Kong and when angry can grow to twice his size. Both have strong wills so Kong can only stay in Jason, or vice versa, for a short period of time before causing each other harm. He has heightened instincts, able to tell if something is wrong or if someone is not who they say they are. Because Kong cannot speak, the others assume he is overreacting.
 Jason Jenkins (voiced by Kirby Morrow as an adult, Alex Doduk as a young boy) - One of the main protagonists of the series. Jason is the orphaned grandson of Dr. Lorna Jenkins and is an "older brother" to Kong. With his DNA, Lorna was able to clone Kong after the original one died from falling to his death from the Empire State Building upon being taken down by planes. He is an archeology major at a university and best friend to classmate Tann. He is also a high-level martial artist. After being tricked by De La Porta and losing the Primal Stones, Jason, along with Tann, Lua and Kong searches for them all over the world while thwarting De La Porta's attempts of activating them for evil purposes. It is obvious Jason has feelings for Lua. In the final episode, Lua and Jason confess their feelings for each other and nearly kiss, but Kong splashes them before they can. Jason occasionally merges with something other than Kong. In "Hidden Fears" Jason merges with Soara the Pteranodon and a Tyrannosaurus when Kong is incapacitated by a giant spider's venom that was used by Harpy. In "DNA Land", he merges with a Fennec Fox to get into Howling Jack Crockett's DNA Land animal park, and later an eagle to get Kong out of there. In "The Renewal", Jason merges with a Pteranodon and then a Triceratops to stop a lava flow while Kong is busy fighting Ominous in a parallel world.
 Eric "Tann" Tannenbaum IV (voiced by Scott McNeil) - Jason's best friend and a fellow college student. Though he is very muscular he is a kind person who will go out of the way to help his friends. He also takes martial arts and trains with Jason, but is not as good as Jason as he was not accepted into a martial arts tournament. His parents are very wealthy and he always likes to buy new gadgets which often become very useful later on. With the trust fund his grandfather left him, he is wealthier than his parents. He is an accomplished pilot, always seen flying a plane (or any other vehicle). He has a strong love for pizza and is often seen eating it with pineapple as a topping. He often states his toes are itchy if he believes something bad is about to happen. In "Framed", it is revealed that he became the godfather to his friend's newborn child.
 Lua (voiced by Saffron Henderson) - A female native who serves as the shaman of Kong Island and the last of her people. She knows many secrets on Kong Island and helps Dr. Jenkins with her research as she knows Dr. Jenkins only wishes to help. She takes her position very seriously even though she is only at the beginning level, keeping the Island secrets from the group and several times risking her life. She also has a pet Smilodon named Chondar. Because she has lived on the island her entire life, she is quite naive about the outside world. It is obvious she has feelings for Jason, as she always gets jealous when the mention of a past female friend of his comes up or another woman shows interest in him. In the final episode, Lua and Jason confess their feelings for each other and nearly kiss, but Kong splashes them with water before they can. In Kong: Return to the Jungle, Lua's pet Smilodon, Chondar, is revealed to be female and has become the mother to a cub called Kip (short for Kipling; after the critically acclaimed author of The Jungle Book).
 Dr. Lorna Jenkins (voiced by Daphne Goldrick in earlier episodes, Kathy Morse in later episodes) - A scientist who is Jason's grandmother and the one who cloned Kong from the DNA of King Kong. She is in the midst of researching the different species on Kong Island as well as the Primal Stones when De La Porta steals them in the first episode. During the missions, she stays back on the island giving information from her research lab in a hidden cave. She is able to help the team with her vast amount of friends in the archeological world to get the information they need. Lorna is seen to be very attractive to her male friends as they often flirt with her when they chat.

Antagonists
 Professor Ramon De La Porta (voiced by David Kaye) - One of the main antagonists of the series. He is apparently of Hispanic origin. He and his men tried to steal scientific secrets from Lorna Jenkins while in stealth suits. An encounter with Jason and Kong resulted in him accidentally getting his hand into a hot chemical when trying to reach for his gun. He and his henchmen escaped and he received a robotic prosthesis. Twenty years later, Ramon gets a job as a professor at the university which Jason and Tann attend. He is shown wearing gloves with one of them hiding a cybernetic hand to replace the one he lost. When Lorna Jenkins sends an e-mail to her grandson, Ramon hacks into it to make it say that he should be invited as well. Once on Kong Island, Ramon reveals himself to Dr. Jenkins as he steals one of the Cyber-Links and merges with Lua's pet Smilodon Chondar. Kong however fends Ramon off. Ramone later managed to kidnap Dr. Jenkins in order for her to lead her to the Primal Stones. Kong gives chase and fends him off, this time as he merges with a cave bear. When Ramon discovers the temple where the Primal Stones are, he manages to steal them even when defeating Kong while merged with a Gigantophis. Jason manages to recover two from him. During the series, Ramon uses the Primal Stones for his own purposes in different locations, even modifying the Cyber-Links he stole to merge with anything that resembles an animal or merge with two animals to form a hybrid. In the end, his life force is sucked out by Harpy as part of the ritual to free Chiros. It is returned to him once Chiros is reimprisoned, but his life force is nonetheless broken by the ritual. He is later hospitalized. Ramon has used the Cyber-Link to merge with animals ranging from Chondar, a cave bear, a Gigantophis, a wild boar, a cat and a scorpion to form a Manticore, a Tyrannosaurus statue at the La Brea Tar Pits, a jaguar, an eagle, the Loch Ness Monster, a cockatoo, a spider monkey (when De La Porta had a tribal invisibility gem), a dog, two German Shepherds to form a two-headed humanoid version of them, and even a strand of Jason's hair to become a clone of Jason.
 Omar (voiced by Scott McNeil) - He is a tall African American and De La Porta's second-in-command. Throughout the series, Omar uses the Cyber-Link to merge with a lion and an eagle to become a Griffin, a Triceratops statue at the La Brea Tar Pits, a giant anteater, a rat, a dog, a mandrill, a coyote, and a lizard.
 Frazetti (voiced by Kirby Morrow) - A muscular man with a blonde cowlick hairstyle who works for De La Porta. He is presumably of Italian heritage. Throughout the series, he has used the Cyber-Link less than the other henchmen that work for De La Porta as he used it to merge with a hyena, a Stegosaurus, and a quetzal and a rattlesnake to become the show's version of Quetzalcoatl.
 Giggles - A large fat man that works for De La Porta. His real name is never revealed, but his nickname comes from the fact he often giggles. Throughout the series, Giggles uses the Cyber-Link to merge with a Komodo dragon, a crocodile, an eagle, a tarantula, a coyote, and a Stegosaurus.
 Tiger Lucy (voiced by Nicole Oliver) - An art dealer that once helped Tann's parents and seemed to grow a crush on Tann. However, she later teams up with De La Porta and is complicit in many of his schemes. She does not care what he wants to do as long as she gets paid. Though she once used the Cyber-Link to become a monstrous cat, she does on one occasion use it to merge with her own cat.
 Rajeev - A one-time henchman of De La Porta who appears in "Top of the World." He is of Indian descent. He and his allies assisted De La Porta in obtaining an ancient parchment from a Himalayan Monastery. He uses the Cyber-Link that De La Porta gave him to merge with a giant Yeti that Kong befriended. Kong manages to defeat Rajeev by freeing the Yeti from Rajeev's control.
 Wu-Chan (voiced by Scott McNeil) - A one-time Chinese henchman of De La Porta who appears in "Curse of the Dragon." He aids De La Porta in kidnapping Jason and Lua in China where Jason was invited to compete in a karate tournament. He and De La Porta force Jason into going into the Tomb of China's First Emperor near the Great Wall of China to retrieve a parchment that will reveal the secrets of the Primal Stone of Life and Death in exchange for Lua's safety. It was mentioned that Wu-Chan couldn't do the job because he is claustrophobic. Tann (who uses Jason's Cyber-Link to reverse-merge with Kong) manages to catch up to Jason and help him retrieve the parchment. Once it is retrieved and given to De La Porta, Wu-Chan is ordered to attack as he uses the Cyber-Link that De La Porta gave him to merge with a Kingsnake and the Pekingese that De La Porta had with him to form a Chinese Dragon. Jason merges with Kong and defeats Wu-Chan.
 Chiros (voiced by Paul Dobson) - One of the main antagonists of the series. He was once a Shaman who sought more power and tried to steal the Primal Stones, and was ultimately transformed into an ancient demon. He was sealed away by the original Kong and his shaman companion. After De La Porta steals some of the Primal Stones, Chiros is slowly released from his imprisonment. Unable to leave where he is imprisoned, he usually has Harpy handle some jobs he gives her. To combat Kong, Chiros often sends Ominous to fight Kong. In the final episode, he is released and fights Kong, but is eventually defeated when Lua casts a spell and Kong throws him into the portal, reimprisoning him. His stone is then destroyed by Kong.
 Harpy (voiced by Pauline Newstone) - She is Chiros' devoted servant and second-in-command. She is a female gargoyle demon. Unlike the rest of Chiros's gargoyle army, she appears more human and is able to think for herself, though she is completely devoted to Chrios' cause. In the final episode, Harpy is turned to stone after being thrown into the spell Lua recites.
 Ominous - A demon who is Chiros' strongest warrior who is able to match even Kong in strength.
 Rakhir (voiced by Ted Cole) - A poacher of Arab descent who travels to Africa to hunt gorillas. He and his men then capture Kong and Lua before Jason and Tann defeat him and free their friends with the help of the other jungle animals.
 Howling Jack Crockett (voiced by Richard Newman) - A film director and stuntman who had disappeared from the public after some legal trouble involving some of his film stunts making him a subject of a news program's "Where are they now" segment. He resurfaced some time later when he sees Kong and pilots a giant robot during Kong's fight with De La Porta and Omar which results in the giant robot getting stuck in the La Brea Tar Pits. The same news program did a follow-up to the "Where are they now" segment where they covered Howling Jack's arrest as he rants that Kong is back from the dead. In the episode "DNA Land," Howling Jack managed to capture Kong and the Giggles/Eagle for his new animal park. This plan was thwarted by the Jason/Eagle who evacuated Kong while Lua rants to the press about Howling Jack's animal exploitation. When on the news program, Howling Jack is taken off set during an interview still ranting about Kong still being alive. In the episode "Interview with a Monkey," Howling Jack Crockett filmed a special where he interviewed some people that witnessed Kong in his pre-tapped footage with some of them not going awry. De La Porta arranged for footage to be given to Howling Jack for the special. This was thwarted by Kong. With Kong taking pity on him, Howling Jack was offered compromise. This leads to the release of Howling Jack's latest film "Kong vs. the One-Eyed Critter from Saturn."
 Giles - Howling Jack's butler who assisted in the development of his animal park. A running gag is that Howling Jack mispronounces his name and Giles would correct him followed by Howling Jack quoting "Whatever."
 Andre (voiced by Ron Halder) - A firearms dealer who sells weapons to terrorists. His first encounter with Jason, Tann, Lua, and Kong occurs when Giggles (who merged with a Komodo dragon) steals some weapons on behalf of De La Porta. Andre and his henchmen raid De La Porta's hideout and kidnap him and the Komodo dragon. Once at his hideout on an offshore oil platform, Andre interrogates De La Porta about how the Cyber-Link works. De La Porta demonstrates for him by having the Cyber-Link merge Andre with the Komodo dragon. As De La Porta gets away, Kong fights Andre. After Kong defeats Andre, the authorities are contacted and Andre and his men are arrested. In "Blue Star," Andre returns when he and his men are poaching humpback whales in the frozen parts of Greenland. When his men are stopped by Kong, he learns of this and pursues them to a lost city hidden in the ice. He manages to steal Jason's Cyber-Link and return through an underwater passage where he uses Jason's Cyber-Link to merge with a polar bear (which his henchmen had captured for Andre's attack). Kong manages to defeat Andre, but he and his henchmen get away. In "Interview with a Monkey" Howling Jack Crockett interviews Andre in prison about his encounter with Kong. It is revealed at some point that he sold Crockett a laser that is seen in "DNA Land", which Crockett tries to disavow to the public.

Episodes

Season 1
 The Return: Part 1 (written by Sean Catherine Derek and Romain Van Leimt)- 18-year-old Jason and his best friend Tann journey to the mysterious Kong Island hidden in the heart of the Bermuda Triangle where many mysteries await them, but the biggest one will change their lives forever.
 The Return: Part 2 (written by Sean Catherine Derek, Larry DiTillio, and Romain Van Leimt)-  The evil Professor Ramon De La Porta arrives and aims to take the mystic Primal Stones, and Jason and Kong must find a way to defeat him.
 Primal Power (written by Richard Mueller and Romain Van Leimt)- De La Porta succeeds in taking the Primal Stones, and now only Kong can stop him and restore peace to the island.
 Dark Force Rising (written by Sean Catherine Derek and Romain Van Leimt)- The theft of the Primal Stones from Kong Island threatens to awaken the ancient demon Chiros. Lua journeys alone to Chiros' ruined temple in an attempt to imprison him. She is captured and brainwashed by Harpy.
 The Giant Claw Robberies (written by Romain Van Leimt and John J. Semper Jr.)- Jason, Tann, Lua, and Kong travel to New York City in an attempt to stop a series of robberies of ancient tablets connected to the Primal Stones. They discover that De La Porta is behind the thefts and is trying to learn how to unlock the power of the Stones. Kong and Jason are forced to battle two monstrous Cyber-Link creatures, BadKat and Slothbear, in order to stop De La Porta.
 Dragon Fire (written by Romain Van Leimt and Richard Mueller)- A "sea monster" is stealing hi-tech weapons. Jason and his friends suspect that it's De La Porta using the Cyber-Link. While investigating, they uncover De La Porta's connection with Andre, a notorious underworld arms dealer. De La Porta attempts to double-cross Andre, but is taken prisoner in Andre's hideout in an offshore oil rig. Jason, Tann, Lua, and Kong attempt to free De La Porta and keep the Cyber-Link from falling into Andre's hands.
 Mistress of the Game (written by Sean Catherine Derek and Jean-Christophe Derrien)- Jason, Kong, Tann, and Lua are forced down in Africa by engine trouble. Lua encounters an evil poacher named Rakhir who kidnaps her to use as bait for Kong. With his mercenary hunters, Rakhir ambushes and captures Kong. With the help of a baby gorilla whose father was captured by Rakhir, Jason and Tann defeat Rakhir and set Lua and Kong free. Jason merges with Kong, becoming Mega-Kong, and the hunters become the hunted.
 Reborn (written by Randy Littlejohn, Christy Marx, and Romain Van Liemt)- Kong, Jason, Tann and Lua investigate a temple in the Atlantean ruins of Shama-Ra on Kong Island. Tann and Lua are possessed by the ancient spirits of the Atlantean King and Queen. They take the Primal Stone of Lightning from Kong's Lair and use it in an attempt to destroy their old enemy Chiros. A massive battle takes place with Jason, Kong, and the Atlanteans fighting against Harpy, Ominous, and an army of Apbats. The minions of Chiros are defeated, but the temple is destroyed. Tann and Lua are released by the King and Queen, who rejoin their ancestors.
 The Infinity Stone (written by Katherine Lawrence and Romain Van Liemt)- In England, De La Porta forces a Druid Priest, Dr. MacKay, to agree to help him use ancient Druid ceremonies to unlock the powers of a Primal Stone. Kong and his friends travel to England to stop them. Merging with a wild boar, De La Porta dukes it out with Kong and forces a retreat. The battle resumes at Stonehenge where MacKay is unleashing the power of the Stone. Merged as a fantastic cat/scorpion hybrid, the manticore, De La Porta holds Kong at bay until the Stone opens up a vortex into Infinity. Kong is nearly sucked into the vortex, but Jason merges with him and becomes Mega-Kong, escaping the vortex and defeating De La Porta.
 Night of the Talons (written by Glenn Leopold and Romain Van Leimt)- De La Porta takes Tann's billionaire parents hostage in Paris, forcing Tann to agree to lead Lua into a trap. An unhappy and confused Tann sends Jason and Kong off on a false trail and takes Lua to a chateau outside Paris and into De La Porta's trap. Jason shows up with Kong, surprising everybody. Kong battles a Cyber-Link-created Gryffin in a tremendous fight over the French countryside and Paris.
 Howling Jack (written by Len Wein and Romain Van Liemt)- Jason, Kong, Tann, and Lua travel to Los Angeles in an attempt to stop De La Porta from stealing a stone tablet on display at an L.A. museum that contains the secrets of the Primal Stones. Down-and-out director and stuntman Howling Jack Crockett spots Kong and becomes obsessed with getting footage of the giant ape.
 The Hidden Fears (written by Sean Catherine Derek and Romain Van Liemt)- Harpy takes Dr. Jenkins and Chon-Dar prisoner in an effort to find the Primal Stones. Jason, Tann, and Lua attempt to rescue them, but Harpy gasses Kong with giant spider venom knocking him unconscious. Lua merges with Kong's mind to try to bring him out of his coma.
 The Sleeping City (written by Larry DiTillio and Romain Van Liemt)- Kong and friends travel to Egypt to foil De La Porta's scheme to find the legendary Staff of Set, use it to activate a Primal Stone and resurrect Set, the ancient Egyptian God of Evil. Pursuing the Professor, Jason, Tann, Lua and Kong are forced to fight a giant Crocodile/Giggles Cyber-link-created monster.
 Top of the World (written by Edouard Blanchot and Philippe Valeriola)- Jason and company discover that De La Porta is on his way to an isolated Himalayan monastery to seize an ancient parchment revealing the use of the Primal Stones. De La Porta and his henchmen attack the monastery, which is defended by a yeti.
 Master of Souls (written by Eric Rondeaux)- An old friend of Tann's, Caroline Watson, has discovered the Primal Stone of the Soul and is being stalked by De La Porta and his men. Tann, Jason, Kong, and Lua fly to Guatemala to rescue her. In an ancient Mayan temple the Professor captures Tann and Caroline and uses the Stone to seize control of their minds.
 Billy (written by Stephane Piera)- On the deserted Manhattan docks, a young boy named Billy witnesses a titanic battle between Kong and a giant Cyber-Rat creature. After the battle, Billy finds one of the Cyber-links. He uses it to merge with a cat, but the link was damaged and the merger creates a giant, formless, creature.
 Enlil's Wrath (written by Dominique Latil)- De La Porta kidnaps a Middle Eastern Shaman and forces him to use the powers of the Air Stone against Kong Island. Terrible storms strike Kong Island. Jason, Tann, Lua and Kong journey to the temple of Enlil in the Middle East to try and stop the mad Professor.
 Indian Summer (written by Jean-Christophe Derrien)- Tiger Lucy and Giggles break into a sacred Indian cave/temple hidden in the Ozark Mountains, and steal a mystical totem for De La Porta. The Professor attempts to use the totem to control the Earth Stone, but his N.Y. headquarters is attacked by vicious swarms of locusts.
 Welcome to Ramon's (written by Edouard Blanchot and Philippe Valeriola)- Ramon De La Porta makes a peace offer to Jason, inviting him to meet with him at an opening at his museum/headquarters in N.Y.. Jason cautiously accepts, but Tann and Lua come in disguise to provide backup with Kong. De La Porta wants Jason to join him in gaining all the Primal Stones to dominate the world together.
 DNA Land (written by Jean-Christophe Derrien)- Jason, Tann, Lua and Kong attempt to trap Professor De La Porta, but the trap turns into a running battle. While the group is distracted, Howling Jack stuns and captures Kong with a powerful laser. He imprisons the giant ape in his DNA Land, a zoo-style compound for rare species. Kong begins working with the other captured animals to escape.

Season 2
 Curse of the Dragon (written by Francis Nief)- Jason is really excited when he receives an invitation to a karate exhibition in the Chinese city of Xi An. Unfortunately, Tann was not invited and now plans to give up karate. Jason and Lua fly to China, where they are kidnapped by Ramon De La Porta and taken to an area near the Great Wall. Buried in the nearby tomb of the first Emperor of China is a parchment that will reveal the secret of the Primal Stone of Life and Death. De La Porta threatens Lua, forcing Jason to enter the deadly tomb maze to recover the parchment. Tann merges with Kong and flies to his buddy's rescue. Together, Tann and Kong rescue Jason and retrieve the parchment from the booby trap-filled maze. Kong battles with a Cyber-link-created Chinese Dragon while Jason and Tann defeat the Professor and rescue Lua. Jason wins the karate tournament and Tann is proud of his bud.
 Blue Star (written by Edouard Blanchot and Philippe Valeriola)- A meteorite glowing with blue energy approaches Earth. Dr. Jenkins deduces that it will collide with the Earth and is attracted by the power of the Primal Stones. Guided by Lua's visions, Jason, Tann, Lua and Kong journey to the lost city of Ultima Thule in the icy wastes of Greenland. En route, they rescue a pod of humpback whales from a gang of poachers under the command of the terrorist Andre. The group finds the lost city hidden beneath the ice pack. In its center is a giant Blue Crystal. Andre attacks in the form of a Cyber-link-created Cyber-bear. Kong defeats the monster in a battle. Lua uses the Blue Crystal and the powers of the whales to activate the Primal Stones, sending a powerful beam of energy up to deflect the meteorite and save the Earth.
 Renewal (written by Jean-Christophe Derrien)- Dr. Jenkins, Jason and Tann host a surprise 15th birthday party for Kong complete with a giant birthday cake. That night, Lua leads Kong out into the jungle where she uses a Primal Stone to open a Portal into another dimension and takes Kong and herself into a parallel world version of Kong Island. Jason and Tann follow. Kong is forced by the other world's Shaman/Judge to undergo a series of tests to see if he is worthy to be the Protector of Kong Island. Kong encounters Ominous and an evil version of himself that attempt to enrage him and divert him from his quest. When his friends are threatened by a titanic tidal wave, Kong abandons his test to rescue them. The Shaman announces that Kong is worthy and returns them all to their own Kong Island.
 Chiros' Child (written by Stephane Piera) - Lua falls into a trap set by the demon Chiros and falls into a fissure deep into the earth. A mysterious young girl treats Lua's wounds and leads her to a cavern containing the secret Chamber of the Thirteen Shamans. Lua is attacked by Apbats, but is saved by the Shamanic powers of the girl. Reading the Chamber's ancient hieroglyphics, Lua becomes convinced that the young girl is Zara, the Child Shaman of Lua's ancestors. They are attacked by Chiros' lava men, but rescued by the arrival of Jason, Tann, and Kong. Escaping to the surface, Lua is determined to show Zara all the secrets of the Island Shamans. Lua is about to give her the Primal Lightning Stone, when Zara's disguise is pierced revealing herself to be Chiros' chief servant Harpy. Harpy uses the Stone's powers to batter Kong, but is defeated by Lua's Shaman powers.
 The Aquanauts (written by Jean-David Morvan)- Professor Ramon De La Porta travels to Loch Ness, Scotland and its sunken Atlantean ruins, which hold the Primal Water Stone. Dr. Jenkins, Jason, Tann, Lua and Kong arrive to stop him. Ramon merges with the Loch Ness monster and attacks. Jason merges with Kong to fight the newly-created Cyber-monster, but Ramon/Nessie beats Kong unconscious. Underwater dwellers, the Aquanauts, rescue Kong/Jason and take them to their underwater Atlantean city and the Temple of Kong. Dr. Jenkins, Lua, and Tann arrive and join them in Tann's mini sub. The Aquanaut Queen falls in love with Jason. Ramon/Nessie attacks, aided by an army of Ramon's mini subs firing advanced weapons. Working together, the group and the valiant Aquanauts defeat Ramon and his minions, setting Nessie free. The Queen throws a big party. Kong and Nessie play.
 Cobra God (written by Savin Yeatman-Eiffel)- Jason, Tann, and Lua are attending an exclusive auction of relics in N.Y. City. Tann outbids the evil Professor Ramon De La Porta for an ancient Atlantean stone tablet, paying ten million dollars. Afterwards Ramon's henchmen attack them, one of whom transforms into a horrible Cyber-link monster, the Omar/dog. Jason merges with Kong to beat back the creature, but in the battle the stone tablet is broken. De La Porta takes the biggest piece and races off to India with the group hot in pursuit. They catch up with him in the legendary lost Palace of the Maharajah high in the mountains. Using the stone tablet and the Primal Stone of Fire, the Professor opens a Portal allowing the titanic Fire Cobra to arrive. Without the full tablet, De La Porta cannot control the monstrous creature and the out-of-control Cobra threatens to burn the world to ashes. Kong valiantly battles the monster allowing the group to destroy the Stone of Fire Portal and causing the Fire Cobra to vanish.
 Windigo (written by Olivier Sicard)- De La Porta and his men travel by helicopter to an isolated Native Canadian village. They take the villagers hostage, forcing the tribe's Shaman, Big Bear, to take Ramon to the Natives' ancient Stone Circle. Using the Cosmic Primal Stone the mad Professor raises the legendary Windigo.
 Dangerous Melody (written by Marc Chomont)- The group tracks De La Porta to the jungles of Burma and the fantastic Forgotten City. In a ruined temple, the Professor tries to activate the Primal Stone of Time. Jason, Tann, and Lua attempt to stop him but are transformed into children by the powers of the Primal Stone. They take the Stone and escape with Kong. The giant ape has his hands full dealing with the younger versions of his friends. De La Porta's henchmen attack, led by a horrible Cyber-link-created monstrosity Giggles/tarantula. Kong defeats the creature in a wild fight, but the children are recaptured along with the Stone. Kong attacks De La Porta and in the ensuing chaos, the Professor and his men are also turned into children. With some clever detective work, Jason and his friends figure out how to reverse the Stone's power and return everyone to their normal ages.
 Green Fear (written by Claude Sacasso)- Jason, Tann, Lua, and Kong travel to the deep jungles of Central Africa to seek out the Gwake tribe. These isolated pygmies hold one of the secrets of the Primal Stones. While rescuing a Gwake child from a hungry panther, Jason discovers a hollow tree filled with ancient hieroglyphics. The group is captured by the pygmies and brought before Ramon De La Porta, who has convinced the Gwake that he is the Protector. He drugs Jason and seizes control of his mind.
 Twilight of the Gods (written by Philippe Daniau and Francois Gaschet)- A terrible electric storm rakes Kong Island activating the Primal Stones and creating a vortex that sends the group's seaplane onto an island in a different time and space. In the island's dense forests, ferocious Vikings attack them. After a brutal fight, Kong is lured into a deep pit. Jason, Tann, and Lua are captured and taken to the Viking village. Kong encounters an Ice Giant in the caverns.
 Framed (written by Dominique Latil)- Tiger Lucy and Omar raid a government arsenal and frame Jason and Tann for the crime.
 The Invisible Threat (written by Francis Nief)- An invisible man lands on Kong Island and steals the Primal Stone of Antimatter.
 Sir James Alex Legacy (written by Stephane Piera)- A giant mutant coyote terrorizes a small village in central Mexico.
 Sacred Songs (written by Joel Bassaget and Olivier Vannalle)- De La Porta's henchmen use radar dishes to drive animals wild in the Australian outback.
 Quetzalcoatl (written by Olivier Sicard)- In Central Mexico, Kong must face off against Quetzalcoatl and free the captive natives who are mining for gold for De La Porta.
 Return to the Redwoods (written by Eric Rondeaux)- De La Porta travels back in time to prevent Dr. Jenkins from completing the experiment that created Kong.
 The 13th Stone (written by Eric Rondeaux)- Jason and his friends travel 6,000 years into the past to the lost continent of Atlantis.
 Interview with a Monkey (written by Jean-Christophe Derrien)- Jason and his friends race to Los Angeles to prevent Howling Jack from revealing the truth about Kong as De La Porta plans to give the footage of Kong to him.
 Lies (written by Annabelle Perrichon)- De La Porta impersonates Jason and dupes Lua into revealing the whereabouts of the Primal Stones.
 Apocalypse (written by Annabelle Perrichon)- Jason, Lua, and Kong search for the last Primal Stone to prevent it from falling into enemy hands.

Cast
 Paul Dobson as Chiros, Doctor (in "Billy")
 Daphne Goldrick as Dr. Lorna Jenkins (earlier episodes)
 Saffron Henderson as Lua
 David Kaye as Ramon De La Porta, News Anchor (in "The Giant Robberies") & Lex (in "Dragon Fire").
 Scott McNeil as Kong, Eric "Tan" Tannenbaum IV, Omar, Naval Captain (in" Dragon Fire"), Silverback (in "Mistress Of The Game") & Wu-Chan (in "Curse of the Great Dragon")
 Kathy Morse as Dr. Lorna Jenkins (later episodes)
 Kirby Morrow as Jason Jenkins, Frazetti
 Pauline Newstone as Harpy

Additional
 Ted Cole as Rakhir (in "Mistress of the Game")
 Alex Doduk as Young Jason Jenkins (in "The Return" Pt. 1)
 Ron Halder as Andre
 Phil Hayes as 
 Ellen Kennedy as Billy's Mom (in "Billy")
 Richard Newman as Howling Jack Crockett, Giles (in "DNA Land")
 Nicole Oliver as Tiger Lucy
 Venus Terzo as Amina (in "The Sleeping City")
 Dale Wilson as Dr. Nagire (in "Top of the World")

Movies

Kong: King of Atlantis (2005)
In 2005, BKN produced a movie called Kong: King of Atlantis, which served as a continuation to the series in order to try and cash in on the 2005 King Kong remake. The movie centres on Kong trying to protect the titular mythic island from a tyrannical human/snake hybridous sorceress.

It's the 8th entry in the King Kong franchise.

The movie was released on DVD in most regions by Warner Home Video.

Kong: Return to the Jungle (2006)
A stand-alone sequel, titled Kong: Return to the Jungle was produced in 2006, and was computer-animated, unlike the first film and the series. In the movie, hunters capture Kong and other animals from his island for a special zoo.

The movie was released on DVD by Genius Entertainment in the United States, Morningstar Entertainment in Canada, and BKN Home Entertainment in the United Kingdom.

It's the 10th entry in the King Kong franchise.

Broadcast
On April 4, 2001, the series was pre-sold in the US to air on Fox's Fox Kids block. The show later premiered on June 2 of that year, and was also confirmed that the series had been pre-sold to M6 in France as well. Fox Kids aired half of the series before taking it off air.

In March 2005, Super RTL acquired the German broadcast rights to the Kong: King of Atlantis movie.

In July 2005, Disney Channels Worldwide purchased the US cable rights to the series alongside Kong: King of Atlantis to air on Toon Disney's Jetix block in anticipation of the release of Peter Jackson's King Kong remake. The series began on Jetix on September 9, 2005, and aired the rest of the episodes that Fox didn't. The movie aired on November 1 of that year.

In October 2005, Turner Broadcasting System Europe acquired the UK broadcast rights to the series to air on Toonami. Kong: King of Atlantis was also acquired for a November airing on the channel alongside Cartoon Network.

In other media

Home Media

United States
On March 20, 2007, Genius Entertainment released two two-disc volumes which make up the whole series. A boxset containing both volumes and the Kong: Return to the Jungle movie was later released.

Video games
Two video games were released based on the series, both on the Nintendo Game Boy Advance. The first, called simply Kong: The Animated Series, was released by Planet Interactive in 2002. The second was released by Majesco Entertainment in 2005, and was based on the direct-to-video film Kong: King of Atlantis.

References

External links

2000s American animated television series
2000s French animated television series
2000 American television series debuts
2001 American television series endings
2000 French television series debuts
2006 French television series endings
American children's animated action television series
American children's animated adventure television series
American children's animated science fantasy television series
French children's animated action television series
French children's animated adventure television series
French children's animated science fantasy television series
Fox Broadcasting Company original programming
King Kong (franchise)
Animated television shows based on films
Television shows adapted into video games
Fox Kids
Jetix original programming
First-run syndicated television programs in the United States
Television series about shapeshifting
Animated television series about orphans
Animated television series about apes